
The Chokwe people, known by many other names (including Kioko, Bajokwe, Chibokwe, Kibokwe, Ciokwe, Cokwe or Badjok), are an ethnic group of Central and Southern Africa. They are found primarily in Angola, southwestern parts of the Democratic Republic of the Congo (Kinshasa to Lualaba), and northwestern parts of Zambia.

Demographics and language
Estimated to be about 1.3 million, their language is usually referred to as Chokwe (or Kichokwe, Tshokwe), a Bantu language in the Benue-Congo branch of Niger-Congo family of languages.

Many also speak the official languages of their countries: English in Zambia, French in Democratic Republic of Congo, and Portuguese (as first or second language) in Angola.

History

The Chokwe were once one of the twelve clans of the great Lunda Empire of 17th- and 18th-century Angola. They were initially employed by Lunda nobles, eventually became independent when they refused to continue paying tribute to the Lunda emperor. Their successful trading and abundant resources caused them to be one of the wealthiest groups in Angola. By 1900, the Chokwe had dismantled the Lunda kingdom (also called the Mwata Yanvo) altogether, using guns they had received in trade from the Ovimbundu. Chokwe language and influence then began to dominate northeastern Angola and spread among the Lunda peoples. As the wars and conflicts grew during the colonial era of the 19th and 20th centuries, both from Europeans from their west and the Swahili-Arabs from their east, they militarily responded and expanded further into northern Angola, Congo and into western Zambia.

The Portuguese had virtually no contact with the Chokwe until the 1830s when the Chokwe traded wax, rubber and ivory. The Portuguese brought an end to the dominance of the Chokwe people in the region, but the Chokwe people fought back.

As a prince, Mwene Mbandu Kapova I of Mbunda played a significant role in the battle between the Chokwe and the Mbunda.

Slavery
In the 18th and 19th centuries, Chokwe people not only suffered from the consequences of slave capture and export, but themselves bought and kept slaves. The Lunda nobles of Angola employed the Chokwe people as soldiers and hunters, first to counter the violence and threats to indigenous political power brought by the colonial demand and export markets for slaves, but once the Chokwe people had the guns, training and ethnic coordination, they overthrew the Lunda and employed slaves on their own for farming and domestic work in the second half of the 19th-century and the early decades of the 20th. The slaves sourced from other ethnic groups of Africa became a prized possession sought by the Chokwe. In upper Zambezi river and Kasai regions particularly, they were once a victim of well armed Portuguese or Belgian raids from the West and Arab-Swahili raids from east (such as by Tippu Tip also known as Hamad bin Muhammad el Murjebi); later, the Chokwe people joined the violence and victimized others by capturing and shipping out a substantial number of captured slaves for financial gains, as well as purchasing and keeping slave women in their own homes from the profits of their craft work.

According to Achim von Oppen, the use of slaves among the Chokwe people was likely a cultural reality on a small scale, before the enormous growth in slave capture and trading activity for the Atlantic colonial market. The old practice had origins in inter-village disputes particularly after injury or murder, where the victim village sought revenge or a slave in compensation for the loss. In cases of giving up a person, it would preferably be a transfer of a child as a slave from the village that caused the loss. As the demand and financial returns of slave trade to the colonial markets grew, many slaves were captured or otherwise passed through the Chokwe controlled territory. They would allow the movement of slave men to continue west towards the ports in cooperation with the Portuguese, while women were often kept. This practice continued long after slavery was banned in Europe and the United States, but the demand for workers elsewhere such as in South America, the Caribbean, Swahili-Arabs, Omani and other colonial plantations market continued, feeding a smuggled slaves market. European explorers who visited the Chokwe villages in early 20th-century reported that a majority of the women there were slaves in polygamous households and a cause of their population boom. In certain regions, like other ethnic groups and Europeans, the Chokwe people used slaves to raid their neighbors for lucrative ivory stockpiles for exports as well as to counter the raids by militarized Arab-Swahili gangs seeking ivory stockpiles and tribute payments.

Society and culture

They are regionally famous for their exceptional crafts work, particularly with baskets, pottery, mask carving, statues, stools and other handicrafts. The art work include utilitarian objects, but often integrates Chokwe mythologies, oral history and spiritual beliefs. For example, the culture hero Chibinda Ilunga who married a Lunda woman and took over power is an often sculpted figure. The Cikungu art personifies the collective power of Chokwe's ancestors, while Mwana po figurines depict the guardians of fertility and procreation. The Ngombo figurines have been traditionally a part of divining spirits who are shaken to tell causes of illness, misfortune, not having babies and other problems faced by a family or a village.

Both chiefs and village groups are found in the Chokwe culture. Villages consist of company compounds with square huts or circular grass-houses with a central space that serves as the meeting place for the villagers.

The Chokwe are traditionally a matrilineal society, but where the woman moves to live with her husband's family after wedding. Polygyny has been a historic practice usually limited to the chief or a wealthy family.

The traditional religious beliefs of the Chokwe center around ancestor spirits worship. In groups where chiefs exist, they are considered the representative of god Kalunga or Nzambi, therefore revered and called Mwanangana or "overseer of the land." There is sometimes perceived to be a spiritual connection between works of arts such as handicrafts and carved objects and ancestors, as well as god Kalunga or Nzambi. With the colonial era, Chowke converted to Christianity en masse yet the original beliefs were retained to produce a syncretism of beliefs and practices. They have, for example, continued their spirit-rituals from pre-Christian era, as well maintained their elaborate rites-of-passage ceremonies particularly to mark the entry into adulthood by men and women.

In popular culture
A Chokwe statue, Chokwe body carvings, blood diamonds, and the Chokwe people figure into the plotline of Donna Leon's 14th Commissario Guido Brunetti mystery novel, Blood From a Stone (2005).

See also
Chikunga

References

Further reading
Areia, M. L. Rodrigues de. Chokwe and their Bantu neighbours. Zürich: Jean David & Gerhard Merzeder, 2003.
Areia, M. L. Rodrigues de, and Roland Kaehr. Les masques: collections d'Angola 2. Collections du Musée d'ethnographie de Neuchâtel 7. Neuchâtel: Musée d'ethnographie, 2009.
Bastin, Marie Louise. Art décoratif tshokwe. 2 vols. Lisboa: Companhia de Diamantes de Angola, Serviços Culturais, 1961.
Bastin, Marie Louise. La sculpture tshokwe. Meudon: A. et F. Chaffin, 1982.
Cerqueira, Ivo Benjamin. Vida social indígena na colónia de Angola: usos e costumes. Lisboa: Divisão de Publicações e Biblioteca, Agência Geral das Colónias, 1947.
Delachaux, Théodore, and Charles-E. Thiébaud. Pays et peuples d'Angola: études, souvenirs. Neuchâtel: Éditions Victor Attinger, 1934.
Jordán, Manuel, ed. Chokwe!: art and initiation among Chowke and related peoples. Munich: Prestel-Verlag, 1998.
Wastiau, Boris. Chokwe. Milan: 5 Continents, 2006.

External links

 Photo documents of chokwe art and information to other objects of African tribal art
 Largest chokwe language resource on the web (Mofeko)

Chokwe
Ethnic groups in Angola
Ethnic groups in Zambia
Ethnic groups in the Democratic Republic of the Congo
Ethnic groups in Namibia